Korean Air Lines Flight 902 (KAL 902) was a scheduled Korean Air Lines flight from Paris to Seoul via Anchorage. On 20 April 1978, the Soviet air defense shot down the aircraft serving the flight, a Boeing 707, near Murmansk, Soviet Union, after the aircraft violated Soviet airspace.

Flight 902 had veered off course over the Arctic Ocean and entered Soviet airspace near the Kola Peninsula, whereupon it was intercepted and fired upon by a Soviet fighter jet. The incident killed two of the 109 passengers and crew members aboard and forced the plane to make an emergency landing on the frozen Korpijärvi lake near the Finnish border.

Events 

Flight 902 departed from Paris, France, at 13:39 local time on a course to Seoul, South Korea. The plane's only scheduled stop was in Anchorage, Alaska, the US, where it would refuel and proceed to Seoul, avoiding Soviet airspace. It was commanded by Captain Kim Chang-kyu (46), with Co-pilot Cha Soon-do and Flight Engineer Lee Khun-shik making up the other flight deck crew. The aircraft made regular radio check-ins as it flew northwest, the last of which, five hours and twenty-one minutes after takeoff, placed it near CFS Alert on Ellesmere Island. The aircraft's flight path took it almost directly over the North Magnetic Pole, causing large errors in the aircraft's magnetic compass-based navigation systems. Its course then turned to the southeast and it flew over the Barents Sea and into Soviet airspace, reaching the Soviet coast an estimated three hours and  after its southward turn.

Soviet air defence

At 21:19 the plane entered Soviet airspace. As the plane did not respond to multiple requests from the ground, a Su-15 interceptor, piloted by Alexander Bosov, was dispatched to intercept the airliner. Having approached KAL902, Bosov waggled the Su-15's wings multiple times, using the international signal for the airliner to follow the interceptor. Instead, KAL902 made a 90-degree turn towards the Soviet-Finnish border. Bosov reported the attempted escape from Soviet airspace to the Air Defence Command Officer Vladimir Tsarkov, and the latter, based on internal instructions, commanded Bosov to shoot down KAL902.

According to Kim's account of the attack, the interceptor approached his aircraft from the right side rather than the left as required by International Civil Aviation Organization (ICAO) regulation. Kim decreased his speed and turned on the navigation lights, indicating that he was ready to follow the Soviet fighter for landing.

According to Soviet reports, the airliner repeatedly ignored commands to follow the interceptor. Flight 902's co-pilot, S.D. Cha said that the crew had attempted to communicate with the interceptor via radio, but did not receive a response.

Bosov tried to convince his superiors that the plane was not a military threat, but after receiving orders to shoot it down at 21:42 he fired an R-60 missile. The missile flew past the target. The missile also punctured the fuselage, causing rapid decompression and jamming one of the plane's four turbines. Korean passenger Bahng Tais Hwang died in the missile strike, which wounded several others.

It fell into a cloud, disappearing from Soviet air defence radars. Soviets mistook the part of the wing that had fallen off Flight 902 for a cruise missile and dispatched another Su-15 interceptor to fire at it. Bosov's Su-15 had to return to the airbase due to low fuel.

Emergency landing
Accounts of the time between the missile strike and Flight 902's landing differ. According to Soviet media, the airliner flew across the whole Kola Peninsula at a low altitude for about 40 minutes, searching for a place to land. According to the diary of a passenger on board Flight 902, an account supported by other passengers, an hour and 40 minutes elapsed before the landing. About two hours after the crash landing, Soviet troops reached the plane to begin the rescue effort, by which time Japanese passenger Yoshitako Sugano had died.

Finnish sources stated that Soviet air defense did not have any information on the plane's whereabouts after it disappeared from the radar. However, Tsarkov stated that another Soviet pilot, Anatoly Kerefov, had located Flight 902 and led it to the Afrikanda air base. Tsarkov went on to say that Kim fell behind and landed on the lake. Kerefov said he practically forced the plane to land on the ice of Korpijärvi.

Rescue of survivors 
Soviet helicopters rescued the survivors and transported them to the city of Kem in Karelia. The passengers were quartered in the garrison's Officers' Lodge.

On 22 April, the survivors, except the pilot and navigator, were transported via Aeroflot from Kem to Murmansk, then by Pan American World Airways to Helsinki-Vantaa Airport in  Finland, where a Korean Air Lines aircraft departed on 23 April for Seoul with the group of Flight 902 survivors and the bodies of those killed.

On 29 April, the pilot and navigator of Flight 902 were released. TASS, the official news agency of the Soviet Union, said that they had confessed to violating Soviet airspace and disregarding orders from the intercepting aircraft to land. According to TASS, the pair had appealed for clemency to the Presidium of the Supreme Soviet, which pardoned and expelled them.

The Soviet Union billed South Korea US$100,000 ($ today) for its caretaking of the passengers; however, the bill was never paid by South Korea.

Aftermath 
The Soviet Union refused to cooperate with international experts while they investigated the incident and did not provide any data from the plane's "black box". The airplane was dismantled and all equipment transferred by helicopter onto a barge in Kandalaksha Gulf. The deputy chief commanding officer of Soviet air defense, Yevgeny Savitsky, personally inspected the aircraft's cockpit.

The crew of Flight 902 blamed navigational error for the plane's course. Passengers said that Kim had told them upon landing that he had suspected the aircraft's navigation equipment was in error but had followed it anyway. After being released from Soviet custody, navigator Lee said similarly that the navigational gyro had malfunctioned.

Korean Air still operates Flight 902 from Paris Charles de Gaulle Airport to Seoul. However, the flight no longer stops at Anchorage or flies to Gimpo International Airport as it now flies directly to Incheon International Airport. Korean Air also no longer flies to Orly Airport. The flight number for a separate flight is 504. As of September 2020, the destination is served using Boeing 777-200ER and Boeing 777-300ER.

Maps

See also

 Aviation safety
 List of accidents and incidents involving commercial aircraft
 List of airliner shootdown incidents
 Korean Air Lines Flight 007

References

External links

 Report on Aviation Safety Network
 Black-and-white photographs of the KAL Boeing 707 wreckage
 KAL 902 fails to appear on time, in Russian (English translation)

1978 in the Soviet Union
Airliner shootdown incidents
Aviation accidents and incidents in 1978
902
Violations of Soviet airspace
Aviation accidents and incidents in Russia
Aviation accidents and incidents in the Soviet Union
Accidents and incidents involving the Boeing 707
1978 in South Korea
1978 in international relations
Korea–Soviet Union relations
1978 controversies
20th-century aircraft shootdown incidents
April 1978 events in Asia